London Buses route 112 is a Transport for London contracted bus route in London, England. Running between Ealing Broadway Station and North Finchley Bus Station, it is operated by Metroline.  The route uses 16 buses from Cricklewood bus garage.

History

Route 112 was included in the June 1996 sale of R&I Coaches to MTL London, which in turn was bought out by Metroline in August 1998.

Route 112 was included in the sale of Tellings-Golden Miller's London bus routes to Travel London on 17 June 2005, which in turn was sold to Abellio London in May 2009.

Upon being re-tendered, on 2 August 2014 the route passed to Metroline. The route was extended from Brent Cross to North Finchley bus station on 29 August 2020.

Current route
Route 112 operates via these primary locations:
Ealing Broadway station   
North Ealing station 
Hanger Lane station 
Stonebridge Park station  
Staples Corner
Brent Cross bus station 
North Finchley bus station

References

External links

Bus routes in London
Transport in the London Borough of Brent
Transport in the London Borough of Ealing